Indomyrma dasypyx is a species of ant that belongs to the genus Indomyrma. It was the only known species of Indomyrma until Indomyrma bellae was described in 2012.

Brown described the species in 1986. They are native to India.

References

External links

Myrmicinae
Hymenoptera of Asia
Insects described in 1986